The Zorros were an Australian rock band, formed in 1979, comprising Nic Chancellor on lead vocals, Darren Smith on lead guitar, Alex Zammit on bass guitar and Greg Pedley on drums.

Biography 

The Zorros were formed in Brunswick as a punk rock band by Nic Chancellor on lead vocals, Greg Pedley on drums, Darren Smith on lead guitar and Alex Zammit on bass guitar. They played their first gig at the Champion Hotel, Fitzroy in January 1980. Nic Chancellor was previously a roadie for 1970s punk band, the News, and a doorman at Bernhardt's Nite Club. Darren Smith played in the Proles. Andrea Jones of Rolling Stone felt that the group members were "very cynical about the softening of the new music. They are adamant that it will be rapidly followed by a resurgence in aggression and when that happens, The Zorros will be the front runners." Chancellor told her that "We get more of a kick out of playing. Hopefully we'll be round long enough to make a record. But it's a big thrill to play for an audience. It'd be an even bigger thrill to play and make money"

The Zorros were popular in the Melbourne music scene of the early 1980s, playing at numerous local venues such as the Crystal Ballroom, Bombay Rock, Brunswick and The Esplanade, St Kilda. In October 1981 released a 7" single on Au Go Go Records, "Too Young", written by Chancellor. It was mixed and produced by Tony Cohen (The Birthday Party), which went to number 3 on the Melbourne 3RRR charts.

In 1988 they released a self-titled, eight-track, EP via Funnel Web Records and Dreamtime Software on a music cassette.

They played at the final live performances at the Crystal Ballroom on 31 October 1987 and played at inner city venues such as Prince of Wales and the Esplanade until 1994. Evolving from Melbourne's indie rock scene, The Zorros played with other bands such as INXS, Rose Tattoo, 21 Faces, Z Cars, Marching Girls and La Femme. They played original independent music for 16 years with over 500 performances and over 500 songs written by Darren and Nic.

Members

 Nic Chancellor – lead vocals, bass guitar (1980–94)
 Greg Pedley – drums (1980–81)
 Darren Smith – guitar (1980–94)
 Alex Zammit – bass guitar (1980–81, 1987–94)
 Craig Russell – bass guitar (1981)
 Phil Bryant – drums (1982)
 Scott Ferris – bass guitar (1982–83)
 Christine Paris: Bass Guitar 1983-1984
 Tim Dexter: Bass Guitar 1984-1985
 Mark Fleming: Drums 1984-1985
 Gary Williamson – drums (1982–83)
 Daniel Smith – drums (1983–94)

Discography

 "Too Young"/"Let Me Love You" – Au Go Go Records (ANDA 016) (October 1981)
 Zorros (EP) – Funnel Web Records (KRC204), Dreamtime Software (1988)

References

External links
 "Zorros – Brunswick to Belfast Melbourne to Mexico"
 "Zorros Videos"
 "The Zorros" at acidplanet.com
 "the Zorros", Inner City Sound

Victoria (Australia) musical groups
Musical groups established in 1979